Selig Soskin (1873–26 February 1959) was an Israeli agronomist and an early member of the Zionist movement.

Biography
Soskin was born in 1873 in Crimea, then part of the Russian Empire. He was active in the Zionist movement while in Russia, and immigrated to Ottoman Palestine in 1896, after studying agronomy in Germany.

He was one of  the founders of the settlement of Be'er Tuvia (until then known as Qastina, after the neighboring Palestinian village of the same name), and worked on the planting of eucalyptus to drain the swamps of Hadera

In 1898, Soskin accompanied Theodor Herzl during his visit to Palestine, and subsequently assisted in research to examine the possibilities for agriculture in different regions in the country. In 1903, he participated in the Sixth Zionist Congress, where he was elected to the Committee for the Study of Eretz Israel, along with Otto Warburg and Franz Oppenheimer. In connection with the works of the committee, he was part of a delegation to El Arish, in the northern Sinai, to investigate the area at the request of Herzl. Part of his agricultural research was conducted in collaboration with Aaron Aaronsohn, with whom he became friends while in Zichron Yaacov in the early part of the twentieth century.

In 1918, he was appointed Director of Settlement on the Jewish National Fund (the "JNF") and, following a tour of Europe, began to examine the implementation of an agricultural model. The model included intensive agriculture on small plots of land. He tried to implement this model in the Binyamina district, and it saw success with the founding of Nahariya in 1934. He also championed the use of hydroponics - the growth of plants on water; in 1944, he proposed a plan to feed liberated Europe with hydroponic vegetables.

He became a supporter of Ze'ev Jabotinsky and of the Revisionist movement.

Awards and honours
 In 1958, Soskin was awarded the Israel Prize, in agriculture. 
 A street in Nahariya is named after him.

See also
List of Israel Prize recipients

References

External links 

1873 births
1959 deaths
People from Taurida Governorate
Jews from the Russian Empire
Emigrants from the Russian Empire to the Ottoman Empire
Jews in Ottoman Palestine
Israeli Jews
Israel Prize in agriculture recipients
Israeli agronomists
Jewish scientists
Jews in Mandatory Palestine
People from Nahariya
People from Be'er Tuvia
Israeli people of Russian-Jewish descent
20th-century agronomists
Crimean Jews